Trepobates trepidus is a species of water strider in the family Gerridae. It is found in from southern Arizona throughout Mexico and Central America to Venezuela and Ecuador.

References

Trepobatinae
Insects described in 1928